Elizabeth Hastings may refer to:

Elizabeth Hastings, Countess of Worcester (before 1556 – 1621), daughter of Francis Hastings, 2nd Earl of Huntingdon and wife of Edward Somerset, 4th Earl of Worcester
Elizabeth Hastings, Countess of Huntingdon (1588–1633), daughter of Ferdinando Stanley, 5th Earl of Derby, and Alice Spencer
Elizabeth Hastings (born about 1605), daughter of Henry Hastings, 5th Earl of Huntingdon and Lady Elizabeth Stanley
Lady Elizabeth Hastings (1682–1739), known as Lady Betty, daughter of Theophilus Hastings, 7th Earl of Huntingdon, philanthropist
Elizabeth Rawdon, Countess of Moira (1731–1808), née Elizabeth Hastings